Carlos dos Santos Rodrigues (born 13 January 1995), known as Carlos Ponck or simply Ponck, is a Cape Verdean professional footballer  who plays as a defender for G.D. Chaves.

Club career
On 27 July 2014, Ponck made his professional debut with Farense in a 2014–15 Taça da Liga match against Chaves. On 29 December 2015, he joined Portuguese champions Benfica, who loaned him out to Paços de Ferreira in January 2016. He then returned to Benfica to play for their reserve team, playing four matches in LigaPro.

On 31 August 2016, Ponck joined Primeira Liga side Chaves on a season-long loan deal. After playing on loan for Aves in the 2017–18 season, Ponck signed a permanent four-year contract with the club.

International career
Ponck made his international debut for the Cape Verde national team in a 2–0 friendly win over Luxembourg on 28 March 2017.
He was named in the roster for the 2021 Africa cup of nations 2021 when the team reached the round of 16.

Honours
Aves
Taça de Portugal: 2017–18

İstanbul Başakşehir
Süper Lig: 2019–20

References

External links
Stats and profile at LPFP 

1995 births
Living people
People from Mindelo
Cape Verdean footballers
Cape Verde international footballers
Association football midfielders
FC Derby players
CS Mindelense players
Liga Portugal 2 players
S.C. Farense players
F.C. Paços de Ferreira players
S.L. Benfica B players
G.D. Chaves players
C.D. Aves players
İstanbul Başakşehir F.K. players
Primeira Liga players
Süper Lig players
Cape Verdean expatriate footballers
Cape Verdean expatriate sportspeople in Portugal
Expatriate footballers in Portugal
Expatriate footballers in Turkey
2021 Africa Cup of Nations players